Thorfinn Karlsefni is a bronze statue by Icelandic sculptor Einar Jónsson.
The first casting of it is located in Fairmount Park on Kelly Drive, at the North end of Boathouse Row, Philadelphia.
The sculpture was commissioned by Joseph Bunford Samuel through a bequest that his wife, Ellen Phillips Samuel, made to the Association for Public Art (formerly the Fairmount Park Art Association), specifying that the funds were to be used to create a series of sculptures "emblematic of the history of America." Thorfinn Karlsefni (1915–1918) was installed along Philadelphia's Kelly Drive near the Samuel Memorial and unveiled on November 20, 1920. The artwork is one of 51 sculptures included in the Association for Public Art's Museum Without Walls: AUDIO™ interpretive audio program for Philadelphia's outdoor sculpture.
There is another casting of the statue in Reykjavík, Iceland.

Inscription

The inscription reads:
(Sculpture, lower proper left:)
Einar Jonsson
sculptor
1915-18 
(On back of Karlsefni's shield: Icelandic verse) 
From the island of the North, of ice and snow, 
Of blossoming valleys and blue mountains, 
Of the midnight sun and the dreamy mists, 
The home of the goddess of northern lights.
(Base, front:) 
Thorfinn Karlsefni
Icelander
1003-1006 
(Base, front plaque:) 
Following Leif Ericson's Discovery of
North America in 1003, Thorfinn Karlsefni
with 165 men and 35 women established a
settlement which lasted for 3 years and
his son Snorri was born in North America
Leif Ericson Society of Pennsylvania
Scandinavian Craft Club of Philadelphia
October 9, 1974

Protests and vandalism
By the 21st century, the statue had become a common rallying location for local white supremacy groups. In time, these rallies led to counter protests and vandalism of the statue. In the early morning hours of October 2, 2018, police were called to the statue's location and found it had been toppled from its stone base and dragged into the nearby Schuylkill River, which broke the head from the body. During recovery, a crane was needed to remove the statue, which weighs several thousand pounds, from the river.

As of 2020, the statue was being conserved, but the City of Philadelphia had no timeline for its reinstallation and was taking the appropriation of the statue by hate groups into consideration as it made plans for the future.

See also
 List of public art in Philadelphia

References

Outdoor sculptures in Philadelphia
1920 sculptures
Bronze sculptures in Pennsylvania
East Fairmount Park
Fairmount, Philadelphia
Statues in Pennsylvania
Sculptures of men in Pennsylvania
1920 establishments in Pennsylvania
Sculptures in Iceland
Vandalized works of art in Pennsylvania